The Fall of Yquatine is a BBC Books original novel written by Nick Walters and based on the long-running British science fiction television series Doctor Who. It features the Eighth Doctor, Fitz and Compassion.

External links
The Cloister Library - The Fall of Yquatine

2000 British novels
2000 science fiction novels
Eighth Doctor Adventures
British science fiction novels
Novels by Nick Walters
Novels set on fictional planets